"Candidatus Azoamicus ciliaticola" is a candidate species of endosymbiotic bacteria belonging to the eub62A3 group of Gammaproteobacteria, characterized for its capacity to perform denitrification within its ciliate host in anaerobic water environments. It was isolated from Lake Zug in Switzerland and described in 2021.

Ecology 
"Ca. A. ciliaticola" is an obligate endosymbiont of an anaerobic freshwater ciliate from the class Plagiopylea. Endosymbiont contains highly reduced genome with 0.29 Mbp while substantial fraction of this genome is dedicated to energy production. "Ca. A. ciliaticola" contains complete gene set for denitrification and is thus the first observed obligate endosymbiont with such pathway.

Extensive genetic potential for energy metabolism hints that the main function of the endosymbiont is to generate ATP and provide it to its ciliate host. Ca. A. ciliaticola thus have functions which are similar to mitochondria, although it is not derived from a mitochondrial line of descent.

It provokes question if also some other eukaryota are using Prokaryotes to transfer electrons to non-canonical electron acceptors such as in the case of denitrification.

Other links 

 Nature podcast
 A microbial marriage reminiscent of mitochondrial evolution

References 

Gammaproteobacteria
Ciliates
Anaerobic respiration
Anaerobes
2021 in science